James Willstrop (born 15 August 1983) is an English professional squash player living in Yorkshire, England. He was born in North Walsham, Norfolk, England.

Career

He trains at Pontefract Squash Club in West Yorkshire, where he was trained by his father, Malcolm Willstrop.

In 2002 Willstrop claimed his third consecutive British Junior Under-19 National Championship title, to establish himself as England's most successful junior player of all time – having won National titles at all age groups (under-12, under-14, under-17, and under-19), and British Junior Open trophies at under-14, under-17, and under-19. In the same year, he established himself as the world's top junior player, claiming both the European and the World junior titles.

Willstrop went on to be one of the youngest players ever to play for the senior England team, representing his country for the first time at both the European and World Team Squash Championships in 2003.

In 2004, he won the Pakistan Open title in Islamabad (upsetting Amr Shabana in the quarter-finals) in his first appearance in a PSA Super Series final. In 2005, he finished runner-up at the British Open as the seventh seed, then followed this by lifting the Qatar Classic trophy in only his second Super Series final appearance. This first-time success led to Willstrop  a career-high World No. 2 in the PSA world rankings published that December. This made Willstrop the top-ranked Englishman, which led to his promotion to squad number one in the England team for the 2005 World Team Championships in Pakistan later in the month when he led the team to victory for the first time in eight years.

In the 2006 Commonwealth Games in Melbourne, Willstrop partnered with Vicky Botwright to a Silver Medal in the Mixed Doubles. Willstrop also won the 2007 British National Squash Championships title, beating John White in the final. In December 2007, Willstrop helped England retain the World Team Championship title in Chennai, India, and won the English Open, beating fellow Yorkshireman Nick Matthew in the final.

Willstrop retained his British National title in February 2008, beating fellow Pontefract player Lee Beachill in the final. He also finished runner-up at the British Open for the second time in May 2008, losing in a five-set final to David Palmer. Willstrop held match balls at 10–9 and 11–10 in the fifth game, but Palmer ultimately won 11–9, 11–9, 8–11, 6–11, and 13–11 (3–2).

In January 2010, Willstrop won his first Tournament of Champions title in New York, defeating World Number 1 Ramy Ashour in the final and dropping only one game during the tournament.

In the singles final of the 2010 Commonwealth Games in Delhi, Willstrop was defeated by compatriot Nick Matthew 11–6, 11–7, 11–7. The match ended after 66 minutes.

Willstrop ended his 2011 season by winning 15 matches in a row en route to winning the Hong Kong Open, the Kuwait Open, and The Punj Lloyd PSA Masters. With those 3 PSA World Series titles, Willstrop put himself into First place in the PSA World Series rankings as well as ensuring his place at the top of the world rankings list. Willstrop succeeded fellow Englishman Nick Matthew as the World No. 1 in January 2012. Matthew regained his World No. 1 spot by defeating Willstrop in the Tournament of Champions 2012 on 26 January 2012.

At the 2018 Commonwealth Games, Willstrop won the Gold Medal in the Men's Singles, beating Paul Coll of New Zealand in straight games, 11-9, 11-4, 11-6.

In 2020, Willstrop won the British National title, beating Joel Makin in the final.

Personal life

Willstrop is a vegan.

He resides in Harrogate, Yorkshire, with his partner Vanessa Atkinson, herself a professional squash player.

World Open final appearances

0 title and 1 runner-up

Major World Series final appearances

British Open: 3 finals (0 title, 3 runner-up)

Tournament of Champions: 3 finals (1 title, 2 runner-up)

Qatar Classic: 2 finals (1 title, 1 runner-up)

US Open: 1 final (0 title, 1 runner-up)

Pakistan International: 1 final (1 title, 0 runner-up)

See also
 Official Men's Squash World Ranking

References

Further reading

External links 

 
 
 
 
 
 
 
 
 Birthday tribute on Squashsite 

1983 births
Living people
English male squash players
Sportspeople from North Yorkshire
People educated at Ackworth School
People from North Walsham
Commonwealth Games silver medallists for England
Commonwealth Games medallists in squash
Squash players at the 2006 Commonwealth Games
Squash players at the 2010 Commonwealth Games
Squash players at the 2018 Commonwealth Games
World Games silver medalists
World Games bronze medalists
Competitors at the 2005 World Games
Competitors at the 2009 World Games
Commonwealth Games gold medallists for England
Commonwealth Games bronze medallists for England
Medallists at the 2006 Commonwealth Games
Medallists at the 2010 Commonwealth Games
Medallists at the 2014 Commonwealth Games
Medallists at the 2018 Commonwealth Games